Mellila, Morocco is a town and rural commune in Benslimane Province, Casablanca-Settat, Morocco. According to the 2004 census it had a population of 14,257.

References

Populated places in Benslimane Province
Rural communes of Casablanca-Settat